= Giacomo Argente =

Italian painter

Giacomo Argente was an Italian painter of the Baroque period, specializing in portrait miniature. He was born in Ferrara in the 17th century, and was mainly active in Turin.

== Bibliography ==
- Ticozzi, Stefano (1830). Dizionario degli architetti, scultori, pittori, intagliatori in rame ed in pietra, coniatori di medaglie, musaicisti, niellatori, intarsiatori d’ogni etá e d’ogni nazione' (Volume 1). Milan: Gaetano Schiepatti. p. 76.
